The Men's team table tennis – 1–2 tournament at the 2016 Summer Paralympics in Rio de Janeiro took place during 14–17 September 2016 at Riocentro Pavilion 3. Classes 1-5 were for athletes with a physical impairment that affected their legs, and who competed in a sitting position. The lower the number, the greater the impact the impairment was on an athlete’s ability to compete.

Results
All times are local time in UTC-3.

Competition Bracket

References

MT01-02